Martin David Gray (born 17 August 1971) is an English professional football manager and former player who played as a midfielder. He played in the Football League for Sunderland, Aldershot, Fulham, Oxford United and Darlington, and managed in the Football League with Darlington and Oldham Athletic.

Playing career
Born in Stockton-on-Tees, County Durham, Gray's main position was in midfield, but he played in all outfield positions during his career. He signed as a trainee to Sunderland in 1990 and stayed with them until 1996 when he made a £100,000 transfer to Oxford United. Darlington agreed to end his contract so that he could retire from his playing career, in order to focus on coaching with the club.

Managerial career

Beginnings
David Hodgson was suspended as Darlington manager on 30 September 2006 while an inquire was carried out into his contacts with another club, leaving Gray and Neil Maddison as joint caretaker managers. Hodgson was subsequently dismissed shortly after. Former Doncaster Rovers manager Dave Penney took over manager on 30 October 2006, with Gray as his assistant.

Gray took over as caretaker manager again on 30 April 2009 after Penney took the managerial role at Oldham Athletic. With Darlington in administration, he was released on 7 May 2009, along with other members of the club's staff. He joined up with Penney again as his assistant at Oldham on 26 May 2009. Gray took over as caretaker manager for the final match of the 2009–10 season after Penney left the club on 6 May 2010. Gray left Oldham on 2 June 2010 after being unsuccessful in his application for the full-time manager's position.

Darlington
On 28 May 2012, Gray was appointed as the manager of Darlington on a two-year contract. In his first season in charge, Gray guided the club to win the Northern League Division One. In his next season, Darlington finished as Northern Premier League Division One North runners-up, but they lost in the play-off semi-final to Ramsbottom United. In the 2014–15 season, Gray guided the club to another second-place finish in the division, and they then secured promotion by winning the play-off final, beating Bamber Bridge 2–0. Darlington won the 2015–16 Northern Premier League Premier Division title. The club finished in fifth place in the 2016–17 National League North, but were unable to participate in the play-offs due to ground grading issues.

Gray resigned from his post as manager on 1 October 2017, with the club stating, "He (Gray) believes he has taken the club as far as it can go, given the current club structure and funding".

York City
He was appointed manager of newly relegated National League North club York City on 1 October 2017, with Penney assisting him as sporting director. He left the club on 19 August 2018 when the club opted against renewing his contract, with the team eighth in the table five matches into the 2018–19 National League North.

Career statistics

Managerial statistics

Honours

As a manager
Darlington
Northern League Division One: 2012–13
Northern Premier League Division One North play-offs: 2014–15
Northern Premier League Premier Division: 2015–16

References

External links

1971 births
Living people
Footballers from Stockton-on-Tees
Footballers from County Durham
English footballers
Association football midfielders
Sunderland A.F.C. players
Aldershot F.C. players
Fulham F.C. players
Oxford United F.C. players
Darlington F.C. players
English Football League players
English football managers
Darlington F.C. managers
Oldham Athletic A.F.C. managers
York City F.C. managers
English Football League managers
Northern Football League managers
Northern Premier League managers
National League (English football) managers
Darlington F.C. non-playing staff
Oldham Athletic A.F.C. non-playing staff